List of episodes for the Exploring Tomorrow radio show.

You can listen to many of them on the Internet Archive collection Exploring Tomorrow.

1957

1958

Unknown

Notes
Some of the episode numbers come from RadioGOLDINdex and are pending verification.
Most of the air dates line up with the list of shows in alphabetical order applied to broadcast dates and are subject to verification.
Most likely the episode (25), "The Hunting Lodge" is also the unidentified episode labeled "New Transylvania (19)." This is the location mentioned in the audio version of the play of "The Hunting Lodge."

Footnotes

Lists of radio series episodes